Ari Eldjárn (born 5 September 1981) is an Icelandic stand-up comedian, writer and actor.

Early life
Ari was born in Reykjavík in 1981.  His father Þórarinn Eldjárn is a writer.  His mother Unnur Ólafsdóttir is a meteorologist, and his paternal grandfather was former president of Iceland Kristján Eldjárn.

Career
Ari began to perform stand-up in May 2009. He wrote for several Icelandic TV programmes, including Mið-Ísland and Hversdagsreglur. He has also appeared in the UK on BBC's Mock the Week. In November 2020, his stand-up show Eagle Fire Iron was released as a vinyl record by Monkey Barrel Records. In December 2020 another of his shows, Pardon My Icelandic, aired on Netflix. In January 2021 Ari was awarded the 2020 Icelandic Optimism Award by President Guðni Th. Jóhannesson.

References

External links

Male actors from Reykjavík
Icelandic comedians
Living people
1981 births
Male comedians
21st-century comedians
Icelandic male writers
21st-century Icelandic male actors
Icelandic screenwriters
Male screenwriters
21st-century screenwriters
21st-century Icelandic writers